Mount Larsen is the name of two mountains in Antarctica:
 Mount Larsen (South Sandwich Islands)
 Mount Larsen (Victoria Land)